Robert W. "Rob" Kauffman is a Republican member of the Pennsylvania House of Representatives for the 89th District and was elected in 2004.  He currently sits on the House Consumer Affairs, Gaming Oversight, and Tourism and Recreational Development Committees.

Personal
Kauffman is married, and lives in Scotland, Pennsylvania with their four children.

Political Positions 
Kauffman is against legalizing adult use of cannabis in Pennsylvania.

After the 2020 Presidential election, Kauffman was one of 26 Pennsylvania House Republicans who called  for withdrawing certification of presidential electors. Afterward, Kauffman traveled to Arizona along with Pennsylvania state senators Doug Mastriano, and Cris Dush, to observe its 2021 Maricopa County presidential ballot audit.

References

External links
Representative Kauffman's official web site
Pennsylvania House profile

Living people
Republican Party members of the Pennsylvania House of Representatives
People from Adams County, Pennsylvania
American University alumni
21st-century American politicians
1974 births